The 1992 United States presidential election in Louisiana took place on November 3, 1992, as part of the 1992 United States presidential election. Voters chose nine representatives, or electors to the Electoral College, who voted for president and vice president.

Louisiana was won by Governor Bill Clinton, a major swing from the statewide results in 1988 when Republican nominee George H. W. Bush carried the state with 54% of the vote and with a double-digit margin of victory. Clinton won most of the parishes and congressional districts in the state, dominating the rural areas of the state. The only congressional district Bush won was the first district, which includes two of the most heavily Republican parishes in the state, Jefferson and St. Tammany. Independent Ross Perot gathered 11.81% of the vote, a strong showing for a third-party candidate but still his sixth-weakest state. Perot did best in the southwestern Acadian bayou parishes, reaching almost 23 percent in Cameron Parish.

Results

Results by congressional district
Clinton won four of seven congressional districts.

Results by parish

See also
 United States presidential elections in Louisiana
 Presidency of Bill Clinton

References

Louisiana
1992
1992 Louisiana elections